Owings is a town center and census-designated place (CDP) in northern Calvert County, Maryland, United States. The population was 2,149 at the 2010 census, up from 1,325 in 2000.

Geography
Owings is located along the northern border of Calvert County at  (38.711919, −76.603901). It is bordered to the north by Friendship in Anne Arundel County. Maryland Route 2 (Solomons Island Road) passes through the CDP west of the center of town, leading north  to Annapolis and south  to Prince Frederick, the Calvert County seat. Maryland Route 260 passes through the center of town and leads southeast  to Chesapeake Beach and northwest  to Upper Marlboro, via MD 4.

The Owings area is considered exurban by the Washington Post. It includes a mix of farmland, single-family detached homes and subdivisions. Aerial maps show that about 50% of the Owings CDP is wooded with county regulations to keep it that way. The place center lies on the former Chesapeake Beach Railway line, which was converted to the roadway Maryland Route 260. Owings was a stop on the railway local service. Hall Creek originates in the Owings vicinity, forms part of the CDP's northern border and winds west until it empties into the Patuxent River. The creek bed cuts a significant valley across the hilly central ridge of the Calvert County peninsula.

Demographics

As of the census of 2000, there were 1,325 people, 426 households, and 356 families residing in the CDP. The racial makeup of the CDP was 86.87% White, 11.47% African American, 0.15% Native American, 0.60% Asian, 0.45% from other races, and 0.45% from two or more races. Hispanic or Latino of any race were 0.75% of the population.

There were 426 households, out of which 42.3% had children under the age of 18 living with them, 71.8% were married couples living together, 8.2% had a female householder with no husband present, and 16.4% were non-families. 10.8% of all households were made up of individuals, and 3.5% had someone living alone who was 65 years of age or older. The average household size was 3.06 and the average family size was 3.30.

In the CDP, the population was spread out, with 29.7% under the age of 18, 5.5% from 18 to 24, 29.9% from 25 to 44, 25.9% from 45 to 64, and 9.1% who were 65 years of age or older. The median age was 38 years. For every 100 females, there were 96.6 males. For every 100 females age 18 and over, there were 89.4 males.

The median income for a household in the CDP was $74,150, and the median income for a family was $74,702. Males had a median income of $49,250 versus $31,204 for females. The per capita income for the CDP was $27,287. About 2.5% of families and 3.5% of the population were below the poverty line, including none of those under age 18 and 9.5% of those age 65 or over.

History
Prior to the arrival of the railroad, Calvert County was a rural county with few roads and no railroads. There were no factories and the primary industry was tobacco farming like most of Southern Maryland prior to the Civil War.

The Owings family had long been present in Maryland since the 18th century in various roles such as real estate brokers, merchants and tradesmen. They were instrumental in the development of the North Beach/Chesapeake Beach area as a summer resort. It was also instrumental in the planning of the Chesapeake Beach Railway and utilizing it to ship canned goods out of the county.

Owings was named after Harry P. Owings. The railway station located at the line's intersection with Solomons Island Road was originally known as "Friendship". It was also a tribute to Harry P. Owings. Mr. Owings had been a one-time member of the Maryland House of Delegates as a Democrat from 1888 to 1889. He was a local farmer and was interested in the real estate business. The town of Owings was a result of that interest as many residents purchased land in the area which he had subdivided through his real estate business. He also served as a sales agent in the county for lime, fertilizer, coal, and corrugated metal roofs. In August 1900, Harry P. Owings requested the position of station manager in a letter sent from Owings Station and now in the archives of the Chesapeake Bay Railway Museum archives and was granted the position.

Harry P. Owings also owned the Owings House located at 9740 Old Solomons Road which is currently recorded with the Maryland Historical Trust. The house was built in 1850 and later served as a boarding house for County residents visiting Owings. The residents would board their horses in the stables and sleep at the Owings House prior to boarding the train the following morning. The Owings railway stop was the only one in Calvert County in the early days of the line.

A sawmill used to operate in Owings in the early 20th Century near Old Solomonds Road. It has since disappeared.

The Maidstone Plantation was listed on the National Register of Historic Places in 1971.

Community Resources

Businesses
Owings has a single convenience store–gas station, two childcare centers, at least one church, and a handful of other small businesses clustered around its center. A medical office building with a pharmacy is at the southeast corner of the Route 2 and Route 260 intersection. A small industrial site has a concrete provider and an automotive shop. There is a funeral home near the southern edge of the CDP.

Public Services
Windy Hill Elementary and Windy Hill Middle School are located at the eastern edge of the CDP on a contiguous campus.

Hutchins Pond is a public pond located within the boundaries of the CDP off of Mount Harmony Lane. It was donated by the Hutchins family. It is managed by the Calvert Nature Society and stocked with trouts by the Maryland Department of Natural Resources.

Owings has a Boys & Girls Club affiliate, the Owings Outlaws, with teams participating in football and basketball.

Housing subdivisions include Cabin Branch, Cross Point, Grover's Summit (1998), Sycamore Ridge (1989), the three Quince Views, Arbor Greene, Fairview and Amber Woods.

References

Census-designated places in Calvert County, Maryland
Census-designated places in Maryland